Patricia Hatsue Saiki (née Fukuda; born May 28, 1930) is an American politician and former educator from Hilo, Hawaii. She served as a Republican in Congress from 1987 to 1991 and then as Administrator of the Small Business Administration under President of the United States George H. W. Bush.

Early life
Saiki was born in Hilo, Hawaii, on May 28, 1930. Saiki graduated from Hilo High School in 1948 and received her bachelor's degree from the University of Hawaiʻi at Mānoa in 1952. Upon graduating from college, Saiki became a teacher at Punahou, Kaimuki Intermediate, and Kalani High schools. She also taught in Toledo, Ohio, when she and her husband, Stanley Saiki, moved there for his medical school residency.

Saiki ran for office after establishing the teacher's chapter of the Hawaii Government Employees Association. Her fellow teachers encouraged her to run for office, which she did in 1968.

Political career
In 1968, Saiki joined the Hawai`i Republican Party and ran successfully for a seat in the Hawai`i State House of Representatives. In 1974, she moved to the Hawai`i State Senate where she served her district until 1982. A vacancy was created by U.S. Rep. Cecil Heftel's untimely leave from Congress, and on September 20, 1986, a special election was held. Saiki lost the special election (to Democrat Neil Abercrombie) but won a separate election (over Democrat Mufi Hannemann) sending her to Congress where she served two consecutive terms. With her election in 1986, she became the first Republican elected to represent Hawaii in the House of Representatives since its statehood. In 1988, she beat challenger Mary Bitterman, a Democrat and former head of Voice of America.

Until the election of Charles Djou on May 22, 2010, Saiki was the only Republican to ever hold a House seat from the state of Hawaii and one of only two Republican Members of Congress (the other being Senator Hiram Fong) to represent the state since it gained statehood. She is also the second woman to be elected to Congress from the state of Hawai`i (the first being Patsy Mink, with whom Saiki served for two years).

While in office, Saiki focused on education-related issues. She was a commissioner for the Western Interstate Commission on Higher Education, and was a member of the Fund for the Improvement of Higher Education. Though fiscally conservative, she also pushed for the redress of Japanese Americans for their internment during World War II.

In 1990, she lost a United States Senate race to Daniel Akaka, but was then appointed Administrator of the Small Business Administration under President George H. W. Bush. In 1994, she lost a race for Governor of Hawaii against Democratic challenger Ben Cayetano. Saiki subsequently chaired the Hawaii Presidential campaign of former New York Mayor Rudy Giuliani in 2008 and the 2010 and 2012 congressional campaigns of Charles Djou. She served from 2014 to 2015 as chair of the Republican Party of Hawaii.

Electoral history

See also
Women in the United States House of Representatives
List of Asian Americans and Pacific Islands Americans in the United States Congress

References

Sources

External links
 Honolulu Star-Bulletin, November 10, 2002 interview.
Patsy F. Saiki Congressional Papers Archival collection
 

|-

|-

|-

|-

|-

1930 births
Administrators of the Small Business Administration
American women of Japanese descent in politics
Schoolteachers from Hawaii
American women educators
Female members of the United States House of Representatives
Asian-American members of the United States House of Representatives
American politicians of Japanese descent
Living people
Hawaii politicians of Japanese descent
Republican Party Hawaii state senators
Japanese-American members of the Cabinet of the United States
Republican Party members of the Hawaii House of Representatives
Members of the United States Congress of Japanese descent
Republican Party members of the United States House of Representatives from Hawaii
Republican National Committee members
Women state legislators in Hawaii
Candidates in the 1990 United States elections
Candidates in the 1994 United States elections
20th-century American women
21st-century American women
Asian conservatism in the United States